Wild is the Wind is a 1957 film directed by George Cukor and starring Anna Magnani, Anthony Quinn, and Anthony Franciosa. It tells the story of an American rancher who, after his wife dies, goes to Italy to marry her sister, but finds that she falls in love with his young ranch hand.

The screenplay was adapted by Arnold Schulman from the 1947 Italian film Fury, which was in turn loosely based on Giovanni Verga's novella La Lupa. The title song, "Wild Is the Wind", was performed by Johnny Mathis.
The Italian title was 'Selvaggio è il vento', literal translation of the original English.

Plot
Gino (Anthony Quinn) is a sheepherder in Nevada who travels to Italy to marry Gioia (Anna Magnani), the sister of his wife, who died a number of years previously.

He brings her back to his ranch, but struggles with the memory of his dead wife, even calling Gioia by his last wife's name. With Gino feeling disappointed with her, Gioia feels neglected and resentful that she is constantly being compared with her late sister and found wanting.

She turns outside of her marriage to fulfill her needs and has an affair with Bene (Anthony Franciosa), a ranch hand whom Gino raised from boyhood and considers as almost a son.

Only then does Gino realize how much he needs Gioia; he pleads with her to stay at the ranch instead of returning to Italy.

Cast
 Anna Magnani as Gioia
 Anthony Quinn as Gino
 Anthony Franciosa as Bene
 Joseph Calleia as Alberto
 Dolores Hart as Angela/Angie
 Lili Valenty as Teresa
 James Flavin as Wool Buyer
 Dick Ryan as Priest
 Iphigenie Castiglioni as Party Guest
 Joseph Vitale as Party Guest
 Ruth Lee as Party Guest
 Frances Morris as Party Guest

Release
The film was the official American entry at the 8th Berlin International Film Festival.

Awards and nominations

See also
 List of American films of 1957
 The Misfits (1961 film), for a comparison of exactly the same theme and scene of lassoing wild Reno horses from a truck, three years later.

References

External links

1957 films
1957 drama films
American drama films
American remakes of Italian films
American black-and-white films
Films scored by Dimitri Tiomkin
Films based on Italian novels
Films directed by George Cukor
Films produced by Hal B. Wallis
Paramount Pictures films
1950s English-language films
1950s American films